Manufactured by Marantz, the Marantz PMD-660 is a portable, solid-state, compact flash audio field recorder. It has 2 XLR (balanced) inputs, 2 line-in inputs, 2 internal microphones and can record in raw WAV or MP3 formats. It is powered with four (non-rechargeable) AA-sized batteries which offers 3.5 to 4 hours of uninterrupted recording.

Uses
As a field recorder, the PMD-660 is designed to be used outside of a controlled studio environment. Uses are electronic news gathering (ENG), podcasting, live music recording.

External links 
 Oade PMD660 Mods
 Customer Reviews at amazon
 Transom.org PMD660 review

Sound recording technology